Jeż (Polish for "Hedgehog") is a Polish coat of arms.

Notable bearers
Notable bearers of this coat of arms have included:

 Aleksander Lisowski, commander of Lisowczycy.
 Jan August Hiż

See also
 Polish heraldry
 Heraldic family
 List of Polish nobility coats of arms

Bibliography
 Tadeusz Gajl: Herbarz polski od średniowiecza do XX wieku : ponad 4500 herbów szlacheckich 37 tysięcy nazwisk 55 tysięcy rodów. L&L, 2007. .
 Bartosz Paprocki: Herby rycerstwa polskiego na pięcioro ksiąg rozdzielone, Kraków, 1584.

External links
 http://gajl.wielcy.pl/herby_nazwiska.php?lang=pl&herb=jez

Polish coats of arms